Rising Star: The Making of Barack Obama  is a 2017 biography of former President of the United States Barack Obama by American author and academic David Garrow. It is Garrow's fifth book.

Background 

Working on the book for nine years, Garrow interviewed Obama on several occasions for the book, though much of those conversations remain off the record.

Reception 

The book was published by William Morrow on May 9, 2017, to mixed reviews. In The New York Times, Michiko Kakutani called the book "a dreary slog of a read: a bloated, tedious and — given its highly intemperate epilogue — ill-considered book that is in desperate need of editing, and way more exhausting than exhaustive." In Time, Sarah Begley said the book nevertheless did "contain intriguing insight into the growing pains of a 20-something who would go on to become the leader of the free world, most vividly in the form of letters he wrote to friends." The book also includes an unpublished 1991 essay co-written by Obama and law school classmate, economist Robert Fisher, arguing that black Americans should "shift away from rights rhetoric and towards the language of opportunity." As an example of false consciousness among the African American community, the essay also mentioned businessman and future president Donald Trump, claiming that the pursuit of upward mobility often takes the following misleading shape: "I may not be Donald Trump now but just you wait; if I don’t make it, my children will."

Rising Star debuted at number 14 on the New York Times bestseller list for hardcover non-fiction.

References

External links
Part one and Part two of Q&A interview with Garrow on Rising Star, June 18 and July 23, 2017, C-SPAN

Biographies about politicians
2017 non-fiction books
Books about Barack Obama
Books by David Garrow
William Morrow and Company books